Chappaquiddick may refer to:

Chappaquiddick Island, a small island on the eastern end of Martha's Vineyard
Chappaquiddick incident, Ted Kennedy's July 1969 automobile accident which occurred on the island
Chappaquiddick (film), a 2017 American docudrama based on the 1969 incident

See also
 Chappaquiddick Bridge, a 1980 punk album by Poison Girls
 Chappaquiddick Skyline, a band fronted by Joe Pernice
 Chappaqua, New York, a hamlet in Westchester County